VG-1 is a B cell line which was derived from primary effusion lymphoma (PEL) . It was first established in 2000 by David T. Scadden’s group at Massachusetts General Hospital. It is infected with Kaposi's sarcoma-associated herpesvirus (KSHV), but negative with Epstein–Barr virus (EBV) .

References

External links
Cellosaurus entry for VG-1

Human cell lines